The following is a list of episodes from PBS series POV, a production of American Documentary, Inc. Since 1988, POV has presented over 400 independently produced documentary films to public television audiences across the country. The series began its 35th season on PBS in 2022.



Season 1 (1988)

Season 2 (1989)

Season 3 (1990)

Season 4 (1991)

Season 5 (1992)

Season 6 (1993)

Season 7 (1994)

Season 8 (1995)

Season 9 (1996)

Season 10 (1997)

Season 11 (1998)

Season 12 (1999-2000)

Season 13 (2000)

Season 14 (2001)

Season 15 (2002-03)

Season 16 (2003-04)

Season 17 (2004)

Season 18 (2005)

Season 19 (2006)

Season 20 (2007)

Season 21 (2008)

Season 22 (2009)

Season 23 (2010)

Season 24 (2011-12)

Season 25 (2012-13)

Season 26 (2013-14)

Season 27 (2014)

Season 28 (2015)

Season 29 (2016)

Season 30 (2017-18)

Season 31 (2018-19)

Season 32 (2019-2020)

Season 33 (2020-21)

Season 34 (2021)

Season 35 (2022-23)

References

External links
 Official POV website
Archive of POV.org (2003-2018) 
 

 
Lists of American non-fiction television series episodes
Lists of documentary films